John Fire Lame Deer (in Lakota Tȟáȟča Hušté; March 17, 1903 – December 14, 1976, also known as Lame Deer, John Fire and John (Fire) Lame Deer) was a Lakota holy man, member of the Heyoka society, grandson of the Miniconjou head man Lame Deer, and father of Archie Fire Lame Deer.

John Fire Lame Deer was a Mineconju-Lakota Sioux born on the Rosebud Indian Reservation.  His father was Silas Fire Let-Them-Have-Enough.  His mother was Sally Red Blanket.  He lived with his grandparents until he was 6 or 7, after which he was placed in a day school near the family until age fourteen.  He was then sent to a boarding school, one of many run by the U.S. Bureau of Indian Affairs for Indian youth.  These schools were designed to assimilate Native Americans into the dominant culture after their forced settlement on reservations. Lame Deer's mother died of tuberculosis in 1920. His father moved north to Standing Rock Indian Reservation soon after and left Lame Deer with land and livestock, which Lame Deer quickly sold.

Lame Deer's life as a young man was rough and wild; he traveled the rodeo circuit as a rider and later as a rodeo clown.  He was a member of the peyote church and tribal policeman as well. According to his personal account, he drank, gambled, womanized, and once went on a several-day-long car theft and drinking binge.

Making his home at the Pine Ridge Reservation and traveling around the country, Lame Deer became known both among the Lakota and to the American public at a time when indigenous culture and spirituality were going through a period of rebirth and the psychedelic movement of the 1960s had yet to disintegrate.  He often participated in American Indian Movement events, including sit-ins at the Black Hills. The Black Hills is land that was legally owned by the Lakota until it was illegally seized by the United States government without compensation after the discovery of gold in the area. The Black Hills are sacred to the Lakota and a number of other Plains tribes. The U.S. Supreme Court found that the federal government "decided to abandon the Nation's treaty obligation to preserve the integrity of the Sioux territory" and used military force to seize the Black Hills. The Lakota continue to campaign for the return of the Black Hills.

Lame Deer, Seeker of Visions
In 1972, Richard Erdoes published Lame Deer, Seeker of Visions; his recorded interviews with Lame Deer are part of the Richard Erdoes Papers at the Beinecke Rare Book and Manuscript Library, Yale University.

The book is about Lame Deer's later life, when he decided that he wanted to be a teacher and a healer. Erdoes writes of Lame Deer's opinions of Elk, Bear, Buffalo, Coyote, and Badger medicine, and the importance Lakota ceremonial traditions played in his later life and eventual understanding of the world.

References

External links

1903 births
1976 deaths
20th-century Native Americans
American animists
Miniconjou people
Native American activists
Religious figures of the indigenous peoples of North America
People from Rosebud Indian Reservation, South Dakota